Srbova or Srbová is a female form of surname Srb. Notable people with the surname include: 

 Renata Srbová (born 1972), Czech sailor
 Tereza Srbova (born 1983), Czech actress, writer, and model

Czech-language surnames